The following lists events that happened during 1993 in Sri Lanka.

Incumbents
President: Ranasinghe Premadasa (until 1 May); Dingiri Banda Wijetunga (starting 1 May)
Prime Minister: Dingiri Banda Wijetunga (until 7 May); Ranil Wickremesinghe (starting 7 May)
Chief Justice: G. P. S. de Silva

Governors
 Central Province – P. C. Imbulana (until May); E. L. Senanayake (starting May) 
 North Central Province – E. L. Senanayake
 North Eastern Province – Nalin Seneviratne (until 30 November); Lionel Fernando (starting 30 November)
 North Western Province – Montague Jayawickrama (until 13 October); Karunasena Kodituwakku (starting 13 October)
 Sabaragamuwa Province – Noel Wimalasena (until 1993); C. N. Saliya Mathew (starting 1993)
 Southern Province – Abdul Bakeer Markar (until December); Leslie Mervyn Jayaratne (starting December)
 Uva Province – Tilak Ratnayake (until March); Abeyratne Pilapitiya (starting March)
 Western Province – Suppiah Sharvananda

Chief Ministers
 Central Province – W. M. P. B. Dissanayake 
 North Central Province – G. D. Mahindasoma 
 North Western Province – Gamini Jayawickrama Perera (until 19 October); G. M. Premachandra (starting 19 October)
 Sabaragamuwa Province – Abeyratne Pilapitiya (until March); Jayatilake Podinilame (starting March)
 Southern Province – M. S. Amarasiri (until October); Amarasiri Dodangoda (starting October)
 Uva Province – Percy Samaraweera
 Western Province – Susil Moonesinghe (until 16 March); Chandrika Kumaratunga (starting 21 May)

Events
 Lalith Athulathmudali, the former Cabinet Minister of Trade, National Security, Agriculture, Education and Deputy Minister of Defence of Sri Lanka was killed at 8:10 p.m. Sri Lanka Time (2.10 p.m. UTC) on 23 April 1993 in Kirulapana.
 The Jaffna lagoon massacre occurred on January 2, 1993, when a Sri Lankan Navy Motor Gun Boat and a number of smaller speed boats intercepted a number of boats transporting people between the south and north shores of the Jaffna Lagoon in the Northern province in Sri Lanka, and attacked them under the glare of a spot light. Roughly 100 civilians and militants were killed.
The Battle of Pooneryn was a battle fought on 11 November 1993 for the town of Pooneryn.
Ranasinghe Premadasa was assassinated on 1 May 1993, during a May day rally, by an LTTE suicide bomber. Little more than a week before, Lalith Athulathmudali had also been assassinated.

Notes 

a.  Gunaratna, Rohan. (1998). Pg.353, Sri Lanka's Ethnic Crisis and National Security, Colombo: South Asian Network on Conflict Research.

References